Bočar is a village located in the Novi Bečej municipality, in the Central Banat District of Serbia. It is situated in the Autonomous Province of Vojvodina. The village has a Serb ethnic majority (80.26%) with a present Hungarian minority (11.34%) and its population numbering 1,895 people (2002 census).

Name

In Serbian, the village is known as Bočar (Бочар), in Hungarian as Bocsár, and in German as Botschar.

Historical population

1961: 2,620
1971: 2,328
1981: 2,095
1991: 2,007
2002: 1,895

See also
List of places in Serbia
List of cities, towns and villages in Vojvodina

References
Slobodan Ćurčić, Broj stanovnika Vojvodine, Novi Sad, 1996.

Populated places in Serbian Banat